Amanita gilbertii  or Gilbert's limbed lepidella is a species of Amanita from France and Germany.

References

External links
 
 

gilbertii